Crystal Palace F.C. was an amateur football club formed in 1861 who contributed a major role in the development of association football during its formative years. They went on to become founder members of the Football Association in 1863, and competed in the first ever FA Cup competition in 1871–72.

It is thought the club disbanded around 1876. The last entry for this club in the Football Annual appears in the 1875 edition. However the current professional Crystal Palace F.C. claims to be a continuation of the original club, after historians asserted a lineage, although disputed,  through the Crystal Palace Company ownership. This has led to claims that Crystal Palace should be recognised as the oldest professional football club in the world in existence today. The claims were rejected by the Football Association after a detailed review by the National Football Museum.

History

Formation

In 1854, the Crystal Palace Exhibition building was relocated from Hyde Park, London and rebuilt in South London near to Sydenham Hill. This area was renamed Crystal Palace and included the Crystal Palace Park that surrounded the site where various sports facilities were built. The amateur Crystal Palace football club was formed here in 1861. It is claimed the football team was established from the Crystal Palace Cricket Club founded in 1857, and that  most of its original players were previously members of the cricket club.

Grounds

The club initially played in Crystal Palace Park using the cricket field. The first game recorded as being played at the Crystal Palace was on 5 April 1862 against Forest Football Club (who later became Wanderers F.C.). For the 1864–65 and 1865–66 seasons, the club moved and played on a field behind the Crooked Billet pub in Penge. In 1866–67 they were homeless, and only three games can be found recorded in the sporting press. A match report from December 1867 states that the club “last year appeared likely to become extinct, in consequence of the loss of their ground at Penge and the seeming impossibility of obtaining another to suit them.” The same report states that the club would make “a fresh start… on part of the Crystal Palace Park Cricket Ground.” The final game played at the Crystal Palace was against Reigate Priory F.C. on 9 January 1875. All the games for the remainder of the season and in 1875–76 were played away from home.

Players

The Football Annuals between 1868 and 1875 record the club having between 60 and 70 members. The players were typically wealthy upper-middle-class businessmen and had the leisure time to participate in sport. 

Douglas Allport played for the club over fourteen seasons and in that time acted as club captain, treasurer, secretary and FA representative. Walter Cutbill (1843-1915) and Arthur Cutbill (1847-1929) were prominent members and both former pupils at Forest School, which was a leading school in the early development of the game.

Walter Dorling (1855-1925) the stepbrother of Isabella Beeton, the famous Mrs Beeton, played for the club between 1872 and 1875. Another player, Penge-born George Rutland Barrington Fleet (1853-1922), stage name Rutland Barrington, was later to gain fame as a star of Gilbert and Sullivan productions. Francis Luscombe (1849-1926), who captained England at rugby, played at least five times for the club between 1869 and 1871.

Committee member and goalkeeper, Croydon-born wine merchant James Turner (1839-1922) became the first proper treasurer of the Football Association after its formation, and numerous Palace players were influential committee-members of the FA during its formative decade.

When international football commenced in 1870 and 1872, players from Crystal Palace featured in both the ‘unofficial’ and the official versions of the first-ever international games.

Four players appeared for the England national team in the full internationals against Scotland between 1872 and 1876:
 Charles Chenery (Forward) (3 caps) – the earliest known contemporaneous international football diarist. Chenery maintained a diary between 1 January 1874 and 19 June 1875. The entries cover football and cricket games including his final England game against Scotland in 1874. He was the only England player to appear in the first three internationals. 
 Alexander Morten (Goalkeeper) (1 cap) Morten is the oldest player ever to make a debut for England (aged 41).
 Arthur Savage (Goalkeeper) (1 cap)
 Charles Eastlake Smith (Forward) (1 cap)

Support of Association Rules

The club became founder members of the Football Association in 1863, and along with Wanderers F.C., Barnes F.C. and the N.N. Club, were described by Charles W. Alcock as being the four clubs who formed ‘the backbone of the Association game’ in its early years. Delegates of the club attended every AGM of the FA for its first crucial decade, during which time the Laws of the Game were evolved. In 1867, when just five delegates turned up at the AGM, it was only the vote of Crystal Palace’s representative Walter Cutbill which prevented the adoption of two major Sheffield Rules laws. Proposals to adopt rouges (secondary goals either side of the main goal) and the virtual abolition of the offside rule were defeated by a single vote.

Creation of the FA Cup

At the Football Association Committee meeting held on 16 October 1871 to discuss the creation of the FA Cup competition, the Crystal Palace captain and secretary Douglas Allport (1838-1915) proposed the formation of a committee to draw up the rules required for the competition. He was also part of the delegation which selected and purchased the trophy.

Palace competed in the first ever FA Cup competition in 1871–72, reaching the semi-final stage, where they lost to the Royal Engineers after a replay.  This was technically the first FA Cup replay, as rule 8 of the competition allowed both teams to go through in the event of a draw, and Palace had taken advantage of that rule after draws with Hitchin F.C. and Wanderers F.C. - the latter tie after playing an innovative 2-1-7 formation, with two full-backs to cope with the extra threat from Wanderers, rather than the traditional 1-1-8 or new 1-2-7 formations.  The club also played in the FA Cup over the next four seasons, but never reached as far again.

Demise of the club

After the club’s last recorded home game at the Crystal Palace on 9 January 1875, a 5–0 victory over Reigate Priory F.C.,  sixteen away games followed, including the final recorded match against Barnes F.C. on 18 December 1875. A fixture arranged for 4 March 1876, against Westminster School at Vincent Square, did not take place because of "the inability of the Palatians to raise a team."

Until the end of the 1875–76 season players were still showing Crystal Palace as their club of origin for representative matches, but the following season club captain Charles Eastlake Smith was playing for Wanderers F.C..

It was the loss of a ground for a second time that resulted in the club being disbanded in 1876. There was a failed attempt to restart the club in January 1883. A team playing under the name "Crystal Palace Rovers" competed against Pilgrims F.C. in Walthamstow. The Athletic News match report stated that this was an attempt to revive “the past glories of the old Crystal Palace Club which, in its day, was one of the strongest metropolitan societies, but eventually came to grief owing to a misunderstanding with the Palace authorities about their ground.”

Colours

The club gave its colours as blue and white jerseys, with dark blue knickerbockers and stockings.  Although there is no record of the jersey pattern, the usual pattern in the era was in hoops, unless otherwise stated.

Records
FA Cup
Semi-finals: 1871–72

References

External links
Profile on Football Club History Database
England players' details
Historical Football Kits

Crystal Palace F.C.
Defunct football clubs in England
Association football clubs established in 1861
Association football clubs disestablished in 1876
Defunct football clubs in London
1861 establishments in England
1876 disestablishments in England
Crystal Palace, London
Works association football teams in England